Club Deportivo Universidad Cruceña, commonly known as Universidad, is a Bolivian football club based in Santa Cruz de la Sierra, Bolivia. Currently, it competes in the Liga Nacional B. The club was founded March 24, 1954. The team's home base is the Estadio Ramón Tahuichi Aguilera.

Football clubs in Bolivia
Association football clubs established in 1954